The  Washington Redskins season was the franchise's 18th season in the National Football League  The team failed to improve on their 7–5 record from 1948 and finished 4-7-1.

Regular season

Schedule

Standings

Roster

References

Washington
Washington Redskins seasons
Washington Redskins